"World Filled with Love" is a song by British singer Craig David. It was written by David and Fraser T. Smith for his second studio album, Slicker Than Your Average (2002). The song served as the album's fifth UK and the fourth worldwide single. It became David's first single to miss the UK top 10, breaking his run of 10 consecutive top-10 hits (counting his two Artful Dodger collaborations), peaking at number 15 on the UK Singles Chart. In Australia, it became his second-lowest charting single, whereas in France, it is his lowest-charting. "World Filled with Love" was the final single taken from the album in France. One further single was released in both the UK and Australia.

Music video
A music video for "World Filled with Love" was directed by directing team Calabazitaz.

Track listing

Notes
  signifies an additional producer

Charts

Release history

References

2003 singles
2003 songs
Craig David songs
Song recordings produced by Fraser T. Smith
Songs written by Craig David
Songs written by Fraser T. Smith